Copperopolis may refer to:
Copperopolis, Arizona, a populated place in Yavapai County
 Copperopolis, Arizona, a variant name for Chiapuk, Arizona
Copperopolis, California, a census-designated place in Calaveras County
Copperopolis (album), released in 1996 by Grant Lee Buffalo
Swansea, Wales, once nicknamed "Copperopolis" for its copper production industry
Queenstown, Tasmania, also nicknamed "Copperopolis" for its copper mining and smelting industry